Ocnerostoma is a genus of moths of the family Yponomeutidae.

Species
Ocnerostoma argentella - Zeller, 1839 
Ocnerostoma copiosella - Frey, 1856 
Ocnerostoma friesei - Svensson, 1966 
Ocnerostoma piniariella - Zeller, 1847 
Ocnerostoma strobivorum - Freeman, 1961 

Yponomeutidae